The Silver Condor Award for Best Film, given by the Argentine Film Critics Association, awards the best film in Argentina each year: There were no ceremonies held (or awards given) in 1958, from 1974 until 1980, and in 1983.

References

Silver Condor Award for Best Film winners
Argentine Film Critics Association
Awards for best film